James Hilary Mulligan (November 21, 1844 – July 1, 1915) was a judge, politician, and poet from Kentucky.

Biography
Mulligan was born in Lexington, Kentucky, son of the locally prominent businessman Dennis Mulligan and Ellen Alice (McCoy) Mulligan. He graduated from St. Mary's College (Collège Sainte-Marie de Montréal) in 1864 and received his law degree from Kentucky University (now Transylvania University) in 1869.

Judge Mulligan was an editor, attorney, judge, legislator (Kentucky House 1881-1889 and Senate 1889-1893), consul-general to Samoa (1894–1896), and orator. While in Samoa, he befriended Scottish novelist Robert Louis Stevenson. Mulligan was himself an editor and poet. His poem "In Kentucky" is perhaps the best known poem about the state, which he delivered at the close of a speech at the Phoenix Hotel in Lexington in 1902.

He married Mary Huston Jackson in 1869 and they had four children. Mary Mulligan died in 1876. Judge Mulligan married Genevieve Morgan Williams in 1881 and they had six children.

His home, Maxwell Place, is now the official residence of the president of the University of Kentucky. He is buried in Calvary Cemetery in Lexington.

References

External links
Guide to the James H. Mulligan "In Kentucky" broadside housed at the University of Kentucky Libraries Special Collections Research Center.

1844 births
1915 deaths
Politicians from Lexington, Kentucky
Transylvania University alumni
Kentucky lawyers
Members of the Kentucky House of Representatives
19th-century American politicians
19th-century American lawyers